Oleksandr Skotsen' (28 July 1918 – 1 September 2003) was a Ukrainian-Canadian footballer, he played for Tryzub Lviv, Ukraina Lviv, Dynamo Kyiv, Olympique Charleroi and OGC Nice. In 1950 he arrived in Canada, where he played for Ukrainian teams Toronto Ukrainians and Toronto Tryzub.

Biography
Skotsen started out in junior team of Bohun Lwów, but after it was closed down by the Polish authorities in 1931, he continued to play at Tryzub Lwów. In 1934 Skotsen debuted for the Tryzub's senior team. In 1935-1939 he played Ukraina Lwów in the district league of Lwów Voivodeship.

During the World War II and Soviet occupation in 1939 Skotsen was added to FC Dynamo Lviv. In January–April 1940 he was listed as a player of FC Dynamo Moscow. Later Skotsen was called on to army and was sent to organize army team in Lviv, DKA Lviv. From September 1940 to June 1941 he was on a roster of FC Dynamo Kyiv. After the Nazi invasion of the Soviet Union, Skotsen returned to Lviv where he coached a local team of the city opera and played for the revived Ukraina Lwów in 1941-1943. In 1943 Skotsen was a playing coach for Dovbush Kolomyia and Lemko Sanok. In 1944 he moved to Slovakia where he joined MŠK Žilina playing at the 1943–44 Slovenská liga. The next season Skotsen spent in Ukraina Saltzburg. In 1946-47 he played for Ukraina Ulm and Phönix-Alemannia Karlsruhe (a predecessor of Karlsruher SC).

In 1948 Skotsen played for Olympique Charleroi in the 1947–48 Belgian First Division. Couple of seasons between 1948 and 1950 he spent playing for OGC Nice. After that he emigrated to Canada where he played for several Ukrainian teams.

Managerial career   
Skotsen was the head coach for the Toronto Ukrainians in the National Soccer League in 1964.

Honours 
 Lviv region (Polish regional A-Class)
 Runners-up: 1936-37, 1937–38, 1938–39
 President of Poland's Football Cup
 Winner: 1938
 Championship of Galicia Distrikt
 Winner: 1942

Publication
 "З футболом у світ. Спомини" (With football to the World. Recollections). Toronto, 1985
 "Львівський "батяр" у київському "Динамо" (Lviv "batiar" in Kievan "Dynamo"). Kiev, 1992 (republished)

References

External links
 
  
 

1918 births
2003 deaths
Sportspeople from Lviv
Soviet emigrants to Canada
Canadian soccer players
Ukrainian footballers
Ukrainian expatriate footballers
Ukrainian expatriate sportspeople in Slovakia
Ukrainian expatriate sportspeople in Austria
Ukrainian expatriate sportspeople in Germany
Ukrainian expatriate sportspeople in Belgium
Ukrainian expatriate sportspeople in France
Expatriate footballers in Slovakia
Expatriate footballers in Austria
Expatriate footballers in Germany
Expatriate footballers in Belgium
Expatriate footballers in France
Ukraina Lwow players
FC Dynamo Kyiv players
MŠK Žilina players
R. Olympic Charleroi Châtelet Farciennes players
OGC Nice players
Belgian Pro League players
Ligue 1 players
Association football forwards
Toronto Ukrainians players
Toronto Tridents players
Soviet Top League players
Canadian National Soccer League players
Canadian National Soccer League coaches